Tisha Felice Waller, (born December 1, 1970) is an American athlete competing in the high jump, who participated in the  1996 Summer Olympics and 2004 Summer Olympics.  She is a five time American Champion, and internationally won the 1998 Goodwill Games, plus bronze medals in the 1991 World University Games and the 1999 World Indoor Championships.

Born in South Boston, Virginia, Waller was raised in Decatur, Georgia. She graduated from Halifax County High School and the University of North Carolina.  After graduating she became a kindergarten teacher, becoming 1996 Teacher of the year honors at Livsey Elementary School in DeKalb County, Georgia.  That same year she won the United States Olympic Trials (track and field) and competed in the home town Olympics. She concentrated on High Jump, coached by Nat Page for a few years but taking the 2001 season off to finish her master's degree at Clark University and return to teaching first grade at a brand new school, Wynbrooke Traditional Theme School in Stone Mountain, Georgia. She was named USATFs Visa Humanitarian Athlete of the Year in 2003.

Waller established an American women's indoor record of 2.01 meters (6' 7.25") at the 1998 USA Indoor Championships on February 28, 1998. Her mark stood for 14 years until it was broken by Chaunte Lowe by a single centimeter, 2.02m, at the 2012 USA Indoor Championships.

International competitions

References

External links

USATF bio

1970 births
Living people
American female high jumpers
Athletes (track and field) at the 1996 Summer Olympics
Athletes (track and field) at the 2004 Summer Olympics
Olympic track and field athletes of the United States
African-American female track and field athletes
Clark University alumni
University of North Carolina at Chapel Hill alumni
People from South Boston, Virginia
People from Decatur, Georgia
Track and field athletes from Virginia
Track and field athletes from Georgia (U.S. state)
Universiade medalists in athletics (track and field)
Goodwill Games medalists in athletics
Universiade bronze medalists for the United States
Medalists at the 1991 Summer Universiade
Competitors at the 1998 Goodwill Games
21st-century African-American sportspeople
21st-century African-American women
20th-century African-American sportspeople
20th-century African-American women